, OEPC or  for short, is an electric utility with its exclusive operational area of Okinawa Prefecture, Japan. It is the smallest by electricity sales among Japan’s ten regional power utilities, indeed, its electricity sales is approximately 1⁄40 of that of The Tokyo Electric Power Company, though it is the largest by revenue among companies headquartered in Okinawa.

References 

Companies listed on the Tokyo Stock Exchange
Electric power companies of Japan
Companies based in Okinawa Prefecture
Public utilities established in 1972
Japanese companies established in 1972
Energy companies established in 1972